Tribolodon (Redfin dace) is a genus of cyprinid fishes found in marine and freshwater in Eastern Asia.

Species
There are currently 4 recognized species in this genus:
 Tribolodon brandtii (Dybowski, 1872) (Pacific redfin)
 Tribolodon hakonensis (Günther, 1877) (Big-scaled redfin, Japanese dace, Ugui)
 Tribolodon nakamurai A. Doi & Shinzawa, 2000
 Tribolodon sachalinensis (A. M. Nikolskii, 1889)

References

 
Cyprinidae genera
Cyprinid fish of Asia